Vero Beach is a city in and the seat of Indian River County, Florida, United States. Vero Beach is the second most populous city in Indian River County. Abundant in beaches and wildlife, Vero Beach is located on Florida's Treasure Coast. It is thirty-four miles south of Melbourne, Florida. According to the U.S. Census Bureau's 2010 data, the city had a population of 15,220.

History

Pre-Columbian

Parts of a human skeleton were found north of Vero in association with the remains of Pleistocene animals in 1915. The find was controversial, and the view that the human remains dated from much later than the Pleistocene prevailed for many years. In 2006, an image of a mastodon or mammoth carved on a bone was found in vicinity of the Vero man discovery. A scientific forensic examination of the bone found the carving had probably been done in the Pleistocene. Archaeologists from Mercyhurst University, in conjunction with the Old Vero Ice Age Sites Committee (OVIASC), conducted excavations at the Old Vero Man site in Vero Beach in 2014–2015. Starting in 2016, archaeologists from Florida Atlantic University joined the Old Vero Man site excavations.

Post-Columbian
In 1715, a Spanish treasure fleet wrecked off the coast of Vero. Eleven out of twelve Spanish ships carrying tonnes of silver foundered in a hurricane. The remains of the silver attracted pirates. A group of 300 unemployed English privateers led by Henry Jennings stole about £87,500 in gold and silver in their first acts of piracy. The coins still wash to the shore to this day.

In 1872, Captain Allen W. Estes officially established the first land patent between the Atlantic Ocean and the Indian River Lagoon, after settling in the area in 1870.

In 1893, Henry Flagler’s Florida East Coast Railway began operation through the area.

The town of Vero was chartered on June 13, 1919.

Vero was officially renamed "Vero Beach" and was switched from being part of St. Lucie County to become the county seat of Indian River County when it was formed in June, 1925. There are many theories on possible origin of the city name, but there's no consensus. Early residential construction in the area often utilized Florida cracker architecture style.

During the war year of 1942, the U.S. Navy selected  surrounding the Vero Beach Municipal Airport as the site of Fort Pierce Naval Amphibious Training Base, a Naval Air Station. Due to the bombing practices conducted during the WWII, there are many buried explosives and the Army Corps officials have conducted ongoing search & clearing exercises for the potentially dangerous items since 2014.

In 1951, Barber Bridge was built from mainland to barrier islands. It was later demolished and replaced in 1995 with the Merrill P. Barber Bridge. It is named after Merrill P. Barber who was the mayor of Vero beach in 1947.

In 1957, Piper Aircraft began research and development in Vero Beach. In 1961 Piper Aircraft moved administrative and manufacturing operations to Vero after completing building additions.

In 1965, the A1A bridge over the Sebastian Inlet connected the two barrier islands. In 1979, the 17th Street Bridge was completed, allowing a second point of access from Vero Beach mainland to the barrier islands.

Demographics
As of the 2010 census, there were 15,220 people, 7,505 households, and 3,946 families residing in the city. There were 10,258 housing units. The racial makeup of the city was 87.5% White, 4.8% Black, 0.30% Native American, 1.8% Asian, 0.00% Pacific Islander, 3.7% from other races, and 1.8% from two or more races. Hispanic or Latino of any race were 10.7% of the population.

There were 7,505 households, out of which 16.5% had children under the age of 18 living with them, 39.2% were married couples living together, 9.3% had a female householder with no husband present, and 47.4% were non-families. 19.6% had someone living alone who was 65 years of age or older, with 4.8% being 85 years and older. The average household size was 2.01 and the average family size was 2.65.

In the city the population was spread out, with 14.1% under the age of 16, 84.1% over 18, 4.3% from 15 to 19, 4.9% from 20 to 24, 5.5% from 20 to 25 and 29.4% who were 65 years of age or older. The median age was 50.9 years.

For every 100 females, there were 92.8 males. The population consists of 51.3% female and 48.7% male.

Geography

Climate

Vero Beach has a humid subtropical climate, with hot and humid summers and warm, drier winters.

Economy

Industry
Vero Beach is home to general aviation manufacturer Piper Aircraft, which is the largest private employer in Indian River County. As of July 2015, Piper employed approximately 750 people. Aside from Piper, the bulk of commercial activity in Vero Beach centers around tourism, the citrus industry and service activities.

Retail
There are two shopping malls: the Indian River Mall, and the Vero Beach Outlets just west of I-95 on State Road 60.
There are small specialty shops along Ocean Drive on the barrier island. There are also a set of shops directly inland in what is called "Miracle Mile." The Historic Downtown is a newly revitalized area of shopping, dining, antique stores, and art galleries.

Tourism

Points of interest

Beaches
The beaches in Vero Beach are part of Florida's Treasure Coast. Vero's three main public beaches are South Beach, accessible at the eastern end of Florida State Road 656 at the eastern end of 17th Street; Humiston Park, in Vero's Central Beach Business District on Ocean Drive and Jaycee Park which is adjacent to Conn Beach.
Vero Beach also has other free public access trails and walkways with beach access, such as Riomar Beach, Sea Cove, Sea Grape Trail, Sexton Plaza, and Turtle Trail.

Water recreation in the Indian River Lagoon
The Indian River Lagoon, passing through Vero Beach, forms a significant portion of the Intracoastal Waterway, and is a hub for boating, fishing, water skiing, diving, kayaking and other small-craft waterborne activities.

Resorts 
Disney's Vero Beach Resort is officially located in Wabasso Beach, a small town north of Vero Beach. , the city hosts 14 private golf clubs.

Historic Dodgertown 
Vero Beach is home to Historic Dodgertown, which initially started operations during World War II as a U.S. Naval Air Station, and later served as the Spring Training facility of the Los Angeles Dodgers baseball team, until 2008. After the team's departure for a new Spring home in Arizona in 2008, it has served as a year-round multi-purpose facility for athletes of all ages. As of January 2, 2019, MLB has assumed control of the historic facilities with plans to expand the complex and rename it The Jackie Robinson Training Complex. This is to honor both the late Jackie Robinson and the site's history as the first racially integrated spring-training center in the American South.

National Register of Historic Places

 Driftwood Inn
 Hallstrom House
 Old Indian River County Courthouse
 Judge Henry F. Gregory House
 Maher Building
 McKee Jungle Gardens
 Old Palmetto Hotel
 Pueblo Arcade
 Royal Park Arcade
 Theodore Hausmann Estate
 Old Vero Beach Community Building
 Vero Beach Diesel Power Plant
 Vero Beach Woman's Club
 Vero Railroad Station
 Vero Theatre

Infrastructure

Transportation

Air
Vero Beach Regional Airport is a public airport one mile northwest of Vero Beach, offering commercial jet service by Elite Airways. Breeze Airways began flying on February 2, 2023.

Bus
Vero Beach is served by GoLine Bus routes.

Rail
The Florida East Coast Railway (FEC) mainline bisects Vero Beach, with an active team track in town serving two off-line lumber/building products customers, who receive boxcars, flatcars and gondolas, . The Vero Railroad Station served the transportation needs of the community and its surrounding agricultural area for almost 65 years from 1903 to 1968. It now serves as a county historical exhibit center.

Education

Public schools
The Indian River County School District operates the following public schools serving Vero Beach:

 Vero Beach High School
 Gifford Middle School
 Oslo Middle School
 Storm Grove Middle School
 Beachland Elementary School
 Citrus Elementary School
 Dodgertown Elementary School
 Glendale Elementary School
 Indian River Academy (elementary school)
 Liberty Magnet School (elementary)
 Osceola Magnet School (elementary)
 Rosewood Magnet School (elementary)
 Vero Beach Elementary School
 Alternative Center for Education

Charter schools
 Indian River Charter High School
 Imagine South Vero
 North County Charter Elementary
 St. Peter's Academy

Private schools

Saint Edward's School. Independent College Preparatory in Episcopal School Tradition; grades pre-K–12
 St. Helen Catholic School
Anderson Academy. grades 8–12
 Masters Academy. grades pre-K–12
Tabernacle Christian School. grades K-8
 SunCoast School. grades pre-K–8

Colleges
 Indian River State College – Mueller Campus
 Treasure Coast Technical College

Notable people

Fred Barnes, journalist, editor of The Weekly Standard and Fox News contributor
Lake Bell, actress, attended school in Vero Beach and her film I Do... Until I Don't is set there
Jade Cargill, professional wrestler signed to AEW and fitness model
Alex Cobb, pitcher for the Los Angeles Angels, attended Vero Beach High School
Gloria Estefan, singer, has a house and owns a hotel in Vero Beach
Tom Fadden, actor
Prince Fielder, professional baseball player
Mardy Fish, former professional tennis player and Olympic Silver medalist
Calvin Souther Fuller, inventor of the solar cell, died 1994
Horace Gifford, architect
David Alan Gore, serial killer
Carl Hiaasen, journalist, novelist, and author
Sandy Koufax, former professional baseball player
Ivan Lendl, former professional tennis player
Richard Littlejohn, columnist for the Daily Mail, lives in Vero Beach
Debbie Mayfield, Florida state senator
F. James McDonald, former president and chief operating officer of General Motors
Alison Mosshart, lead singer of The Kills and The Dead Weather
Jake Owen, country music singer-songwriter, graduate of Vero Beach High School, 1999
Peter George Peterson, co-founder, Blackstone Group
Albert Reed, model, 2007 Dancing with the Stars competitor, actor, graduate of Vero Beach High School, 2003
Priscilla Renea, singer-songwriter signed to Capitol Records, debut album entitled "Jukebox" released in 2009
Norman Sas, inventor of Electric football
Waldo E. Sexton, early settler and pioneer
Parvati Shallow, winner of Survivor: Micronesia, runner-up in Survivor: Heroes vs. Villains
Eric Smith, former professional football player for the Chicago Bears of the National Football League
Bryan Stork, professional football player for the Washington Redskins of the NFL
Roscoe Tanner, former professional tennis player
Rick Wiles, Christian Broadcaster and antisemitic conspiracy theorist

References

External links

 
Cities in Florida
Cities in Indian River County, Florida
Populated coastal places in Florida on the Atlantic Ocean
County seats in Florida
Helen Blazes
1919 establishments in Florida